Silvia Farina Elia was the defending champion and successfully defended her title, by defeating Jelena Dokic 6–4, 3–6, 6–3 in the final.

Seeds
The first two seeds received a bye into the second round.

Draw

Finals

Top half

Bottom half

References

External links
 Official results archive (ITF)
 Official results archive (WTA)

Internationaux de Strasbourgandnbsp;- Singles
2002 Singles
Internationaux de Strasbourg